A Fire Inside EP is an extended play by American rock band AFI. It was released on September 29, 1998, through Adeline Records. The EP is titled after the band's full moniker, first revealed with their previous album, Shut Your Mouth and Open Your Eyes. The release includes two original songs and two covers. It is the first release to mention Hunter Burgan as a permanent member, and the last to feature founding guitarist Mark Stopholese. Behind the CD tray is the message "Nothing can erase the damage done".

In November 2010, Adeline Records released a special edition pressing on purple vinyl, limited to 500 copies.

Track listing

Personnel 
Credits adapted from liner notes.

 AFI – producer
 Joe Brook – band photos
 Hunter Burgan – bass
 Adam Carson – drums
 Andy Earnst – recording, mixing
 Tedd Francis – lyric art
 Davey Havok – vocals
 John Joh – re-design 
 Markus Stopholese – guitar
 Luke Ogden – fire photo
 Jamie Reilly – layout
 Jim Thiebaud – layout

Studios
 Recorded at The Art of Ears, Hayward, CA
 Mastered at Oceanview Digital Mastering, LA, CA

References

1998 EPs
AFI (band) EPs
Adeline Records EPs